The Eighth Day is a 1996 Franco-Belgian comedy-drama film that tells the story of the friendship that develops between two men who meet by chance. Harry (Daniel Auteuil), a divorced businessman who feels alienated from his children, meets Georges (Pascal Duquenne), an institutionalised man with Down syndrome, after Georges has escaped from his mental institution and is nearly run over by Harry. The film was selected as the Belgian entry for the Best Foreign Language Film at the 69th Academy Awards, but was not accepted as a nominee.

The film was written and directed by Jaco Van Dormael. Some scenes in the film appear as dream sequences, often employing magical realism. The music of Luis Mariano ("Mexico," and "Maman, Tu Es La Plus Belle Du Monde") is used in these scenes, with actor Laszlo Harmati playing Mariano, who died in 1970. The original music score is from Pierre Van Dormael, Jaco's brother.

Cast

 Daniel Auteuil as Harry
 Pascal Duquenne as Georges
 Miou-Miou as Julie
 Henri Garcin as The director of the bank
 Isabelle Sadoyan as Georges' Mother
 Michele Maes as Nathalie
 Fabienne Loriaux as Fabienne
 Hélène Roussel as Julie's mother
 Alice van Dormael as Alice
 Juliette Van Dormael as Juliette
 Didier De Neck as Fabienne's husband
 Marie-Pierre Meinzel
 Sabrina Leurquin as Waitress in fast food restaurant
 Laszlo Harmati as Luis Mariano

Reception
The film grossed $24.3 million in France and $37.1 million worldwide.

Awards
This film was nominated for the Palme d'Or award, the top prize at the 1996 Cannes Film Festival. It did win the Best Actor award at the festival, which was given to both Pascal Duquenne and Daniel Auteuil.

The film was also nominated for a César Award and a Golden Globe award.

See also
 List of submissions to the 69th Academy Awards for Best Foreign Language Film
 List of Belgian submissions for the Academy Award for Best Foreign Language Film

References

External links

1996 films
1996 comedy-drama films
Down syndrome in film
1990s French-language films
Films about friendship
Films directed by Jaco Van Dormael
Films shot in Brussels
Gramercy Pictures films
Pan-Européenne films
PolyGram Filmed Entertainment films
Belgian comedy-drama films
French-language Belgian films